Democratic Bulgaria (ДБ, Demokratichna Balgariya, DB) is an electoral alliance in Bulgaria formed by three political parties – Yes, Bulgaria!, Democrats for a Strong Bulgaria and The Greens. The union was created on 12 April 2018.

History 
The creation of Democratic Bulgaria was officially announced through the symbolic signing of a declaration entitled "A Democratic Bulgaria Can Do More". The three parties united after several months of talks on cooperation during the next general election. In its manifesto, the union set out its main goals, including to be an alternative to the current government and to consolidate Bulgaria's democratic values and Euro-Atlantic choices.

Structure 
The Democratic Bulgaria structure has two co-leaders – Hristo Ivanov of Yes, Bulgaria! and Atanas Atanasov of Democrats for a Strong Bulgaria. The leaders of The Greens – Vladislav Panev and Borislav Sandov – also participate in the union's council.

Composition

Political positions

Finance 
Some of DB's priorities are Bulgaria's Eurozone and Banking union membership, a reduction of budget spending to 1/3 of the GDP, as well as taxation reform, with a reduction of VAT from 20% to 18% and a non-taxable minimum of the income tax.

Defense 
In the sphere of defense, the party seeks public support of the Armed Forces using the Social contract of defensive politics.

Presidential endorsement 
For the 2021 Bulgarian presidential election, DB supported the election bid of Lozan Panov, the chairman of the Bulgarian supreme court.

Election results

2019 European Parliament election 
In order to select its candidates, Yes, Bulgaria! conducted a remote preliminary election. Those willing to vote could do it digitally using the mobile app of Yes, Bulgaria! or by mail. All members of Yes, Bulgaria! had the right to participate, together with everyone who received an invitation from a current party member. The electoral process began on 27 November 2018, and the final results were declared on 11 February 2019. A total of 5898 people voted, and the candidate with the most votes was Stefan Tafrov, a diplomat and former ambassador.

The candidate of Democrats for a Strong Bulgaria for the European elections Svetoslav Malinov was selected through a resolution during the party's National Congress on 12 November 2018. Malinov has been a Member of the European Parliament since 2009 as a member of the European People's Party.

On February 22, 2019, The Greens announced their primary candidate for the elections – Albena Simeonova – an environmentalist and entrepreneur in the sphere of bio agriculture. She was elected through an online vote on the website of the party.

Democratic Bulgaria eventually won one seat in the 2019 European Parliament election, which went to DSB member Radan Kanev.

2019 Local elections 
Local elections were held across Bulgaria on 27 October 2019, with Democratic Bulgaria failing to win a single mayoral contest, but far exceeding expectations in the capital Sofia, where they won 8 out of 25 districts, including most of the city center. The results were seen as a serious setback for the ruling party GERB, which had until then maintained a strong hold on the capital, winning 23 out of 25 districts in 2015.

Electoral history

National Assembly

European Parliament

References 

Conservative parties in Bulgaria
Conservative liberal parties
Liberal parties in Bulgaria
Political party alliances in Bulgaria